Stewart Davies (born 1955) is a former Australian international lawn and indoor bowler.

He won a silver medal in the fours with Adam Jeffery, Kevin Walsh and Rex Johnston at the 1998 Commonwealth Games in Kuala Lumpur.

References

1955 births
Australian male bowls players
Living people
Commonwealth Games medallists in lawn bowls
Commonwealth Games silver medallists for Australia
Bowls players at the 1998 Commonwealth Games
20th-century Australian people
Medallists at the 1998 Commonwealth Games